Ganj-e Qobad (also Romanized as Ganj-e Qobād and Ganj Qobād) is a village in Qombovan Rural District, in the Central District of Dehaqan County, Isfahan Province, Iran. At the 2006 census, its population was 55, in 22 families.

References 

Populated places in Dehaqan County